Zhangsolvidae is an extinct family of brachyceran flies known from the Cretaceous period. Members of the family possess a long proboscis, varying in length between 1.3 and 7 mm depending on the species, and were probably nectarivores. A specimen has been found with preserved Bennettitales pollen, suggesting that they acted as pollinators for extinct gymnosperms. They are considered to be members of the Stratiomyomorpha.

Taxonomy 
 †Buccinatormyia Arillo et al. 2015
 †Buccinatormyia gangnami Khramov and Nam 2019 Jinju Formation , South Korea, Albian
 †Buccinatormyia magnifica Arillo et al. 2015 Spanish amber, Albian
 †Buccinatormyia soplaensis Arillo et al. 2015 Spanish amber, Albian
 †Burmomyia Zhang and Wang 2019
 †Burmomyia rossi Zhang and Wang 2019  Burmese amber, Myanmar, Cenomanian
 †Cratomyia Mazzarolo and Amorim 2000
 †Cratomyia cretacica Wilkommen 2007 Crato Formation , Brazil, Aptian
 †Cratomyia macrorrhyncha Mazzarolo and Amorim 2000 Crato Formation, Brazil, Aptian
 †Cratomyia mimetica Grimaldi 2016  Burmese amber, Myanmar, Cenomanian
 †Cratomyia zhuoi Zhang and Wang 2019 Burmese amber, Myanmar, Cenomanian
 †Linguatormyia Grimaldi 2015 in Arillo et al. 2015
 †Linguatormyia teletacta Grimaldi 2015 in Arillo et al. 2015 Burmese amber, Myanmar, Cenomanian
 †Zhangsolva Nagatomi and Yang 1998
 †Zhangsolva cupressa Zhang et al. 1993 Laiyang Formation, China, Aptian
†Zhangsolva burmensis Zhang & Zhang, 2021 Burmese amber, Myanmar, Cenomanian

References

Brachycera families
Prehistoric insect families